The Khumani mine is a large iron mine located in central South Africa in Northern Cape. Khumani represents one of the largest iron ore reserves in South Africa and in the world having estimated reserves of 709 million tonnes of ore grading 64.2% iron metal.

References 

Iron mines in South Africa
Economy of the Northern Cape
Geography of the Northern Cape